Chang'e 4 is a robotic spacecraft mission, part of the second phase of the Chinese Lunar Exploration Program.   China achieved humanity's first soft landing on the far side of the Moon, on 3 January 2019.

A communication relay satellite, was first launched to a halo orbit near the Earth–Moon L2 point in May 2018. The robotic lander and Yutu-2 rover were launched on 7 December 2018 and entered lunar orbit on 12 December 2018, before landing on the Moon's far side. The mission is the follow-up to Chang'e 3, the first Chinese landing on the Moon.

The spacecraft was originally built as a backup for Chang'e 3 and became available after Chang'e 3 landed successfully in 2013. The configuration of Chang'e 4 was adjusted to meet new scientific and performance objectives. Like its predecessors, the mission is named after Chang'e, the Chinese Moon goddess.

In November 2019, Chang’e 4 mission team was awarded Gold Medal by the Royal Aeronautical Society. In October 2020, the mission was awarded the World Space Award by the International Astronautical Federation. Both were the first time for any Chinese mission to receive such awards.

Overview 

The Chinese Lunar Exploration Program is designed to be conducted in four phases of incremental technological advancement: The first is simply reaching lunar orbit, a task completed by Chang'e 1 in 2007 and Chang'e 2 in 2010. The second is landing and roving on the Moon, as Chang'e 3 did in 2013 and Chang'e 4 did in 2019. The third is collecting lunar samples from the near-side and sending them to Earth, a task Chang'e 5 completed in 2020, and Chang'e 6 will attempt in the future. The fourth phase consists of development of a robotic research station near the Moon's south pole. 

The program aims to facilitate a crewed lunar landing in the 2030s and possibly the building of an outpost near the south pole. The Chinese Lunar Exploration Program has started to incorporate private investment from individuals and enterprises for the first time, a move aimed at accelerating aerospace innovation, cutting production costs, and promoting militarycivilian relationships.

This mission will attempt to determine the age and composition of an unexplored region of the Moon, as well as develop technologies required for the later stages of the program.

The landing craft touched down at 02:26 UTC on 3 January 2019, becoming the first spacecraft to land on the far side of the Moon. Yutu-2 rover was deployed about 12 hours after the landing.

Launch 
The Chang'e 4 mission was first scheduled for launch in 2015 as part of the second phase of the Chinese Lunar Exploration Program. But the adjusted objectives and design of the mission imposed delays, and finally launched on 7 December 2018, 18:23 UTC.

Selenocentric phase 
The spacecraft entered lunar orbit on 12 December 2018, 08:45 UTC.

Landing took place on 3 January 2019 at 02:26 UTC, shortly after lunar sunrise over the Von Kármán crater in the large South Pole-Aitken basin.

Objectives
If Chang'e 4 can find and study some of this material, it would get an unprecedented view into the Moon's internal structure and origins. The specific scientific objectives are:
 Measure the chemical compositions of lunar rocks and soils
 Measure lunar surface temperature over the duration of the mission.
 Carry out low-frequency radio astronomical observation and research using a radio telescope
 Study of cosmic rays
 Observe the solar corona, investigate its radiation characteristics and mechanism, and explore the evolution and transport of coronal mass ejections (CME) between the Sun and Earth.

Components

Queqiao relay satellite

Direct communication with Earth is impossible on the far side of the Moon, since transmissions are blocked by the Moon. Communications must go through a communications relay satellite, which is placed at a location that has a clear view of both the landing site and the Earth. As part of the Lunar Exploration Program, the China National Space Administration (CNSA) launched the Queqiao relay satellite on 20 May 2018 to a halo orbit around the Earth–Moon L2 point.

The spacecraft took 24 days to reach L2, using a lunar swing-by to save fuel. This is the first lunar relay satellite at this location.

The name Queqiao ("Magpie Bridge") was inspired by and came from the Chinese tale The Cowherd and the Weaver Girl.

Longjiang microsatellites

As part of the Chang'e 4 mission, two microsatellites ( each) named Longjiang-1 and Longjiang-2 (also known as Discovering the Sky at Longest Wavelengths Pathfinder or DSLWP ), were launched along with Queqiao in May 2018. Both satellites were developed by Harbin Institute of Technology, China. Longjiang-1 failed to enter lunar orbit, but Longjiang-2 succeeded and operated in lunar orbit until 31 July 2019 when it was deliberately directed to crash onto the Moon. 

Longjiang 2's crash site is located at  inside Van Gent crater, where it made a 4 by 5 metre crater upon impact.
Due to the Earth's ionosphere, no observations in this frequency range have been done in Earth orbit, offering potential breakthrough science.

Chang'e lander and Yutu-2 rover

The Chang'e 4 lander and rover design was modeled after Chang'e-3 and its Yutu rover. In fact, Chang'e 4 was built as a backup to Chang'e 3, and based on the experience and results from that mission, Chang'e 4 was adapted to the specifics of the new mission. The lander and rover were launched by Long March 3B rocket on 7 December 2018, 18:23 UTC, six months after the launch of the Queqiao relay satellite.

Both the stationary lander and Yutu-2 rover are equipped with a radioisotope heater unit (RHU) in order to heat their subsystems during the long lunar nights, while electrical power is generated by solar panels.

After landing, the lander extended a ramp to deploy the Yutu-2 rover (literally: "Jade Rabbit") to the lunar surface. Yutu-2 rover was manufactured in Dongguan, Guangdong province; it is solar-powered, RHU-heated, and it is propelled by six wheels. The rover's nominal operating time is three months, but after the experience with Yutu rover in 2013, the rover design was improved and Chinese engineers are hopeful it will operate for "a few years." In December 2019, Yutu 2 broke the lunar longevity record, previously held by the Soviet Union's Lunokhod 1 rover.

Science payloads
The communications relay satellite, orbiting microsatellite, lander and rover each carry scientific payloads. The relay satellite is performing radio astronomy, whereas the lander and Yutu-2 rover will study the geophysics of the landing zone. The science payloads are, in part, supplied by international partners in Sweden, Germany, the Netherlands, and Saudi Arabia.

Relay satellite
The primary function of the Queqiao relay satellite that is deployed in a halo orbit around the Earth–Moon L2 point is to provide continuous relay communications between Earth and the lander on the far side of the Moon.

The Queqiao launched on 21 May 2018. It used a lunar swing-by transfer orbit to reach the moon. After the first trajectory correction maneuvers (TCMs), the spacecraft is in place. On 25 May, Queqiao approached the vicinity of the L2. After several small adjustments, Queqiao arrived at L2 halo orbit on 14 June.

Additionally, this satellite hosts the Netherlands–China Low-Frequency Explorer (NCLE), an instrument performing astrophysical studies in the unexplored radio regime of 80 kilohertz to 80 megahertz. It was developed by the Radboud University in Netherlands and the Chinese Academy of Sciences. The NCLE on the orbiter and the LFS on the lander work in synergy performing low-frequency (0.1–80 MHz) radio astronomical observations.

Lunar lander

The lander and rover carry scientific payloads to study the geophysics of the landing zone, with a life science and modest chemical analysis capability. The lander is equipped with the following payloads:
 Terrain Camera (TCAM), mounted on top of the lander and able to rotate 360°, is being used to image the lunar surface and the rover in high definition.
 Low Frequency Spectrometer (LFS) to research solar radio bursts at frequencies between 0.1 and 40 MHz and to study the lunar ionosphere.
 Lunar Lander Neutrons and Dosimetry (LND), a (neutron) dosimeter developed by Kiel University in Germany. It is gathering information about radiation dosimetry for future human exploration of the Moon, and will contribute to solar wind studies. It has shown that the radiation dose on the surface of the Moon is 2 to 3 times higher than what astronauts experience in the ISS.
The experiment includes six types of organisms: cottonseed, potato, rapeseed, Arabidopsis thaliana (a flowering plant), as well as yeast and fruit fly eggs. Environmental systems keep the container hospitable and Earth-like, except for the low lunar gravity and radiation. If the fly eggs hatch, the larvae would produce carbon dioxide, while the germinated plants would release oxygen through photosynthesis. It was hoped that together, the plants and fruit flies could establish a simple synergy within the container. Yeast would play a role in regulating carbon dioxide and oxygen, as well as decomposing processed waste from the flies and the dead plants to create an additional food source for the insects. The biological experiment was designed by 28 Chinese universities. Research in such closed ecological systems informs astrobiology and the development of biological life support systems for long duration missions in space stations or space habitats for eventual space farming.

Result: Within a few hours after landing on 3 January 2019, the biosphere's temperature was adjusted to 24°C and the seeds were watered. On 15 January 2019, it was reported that cottonseed, rapeseed and potato seeds had sprouted, but images of only cottonseed were released.

Lunar rover

 Panoramic Camera (PCAM), is installed on the rover's mast and can rotate 360°. It has a spectral range of 420 nm–700 nm and it acquires 3D images by binocular stereovision.
 Lunar penetrating radar (LPR), is a ground penetrating radar with a probing depth of approximately 30 m with 30 cm vertical resolution, and more than 100 m with 10 m vertical resolution.
 Visible and Near-Infrared Imaging Spectrometer (VNIS), for imaging spectroscopy that can then be used for identification of surface materials and atmospheric trace gases. The spectral range covers visible to near-infrared wavelengths (450 nm - 950 nm).
 Advanced Small Analyzer for Neutrals (ASAN), is an energetic neutral atom analyzer provided by the Swedish Institute of Space Physics (IRF). It will reveal how solar wind interacts with the lunar surface, which may help determine the process behind the formation of lunar water.

Cost
The cost of the entire mission was close to building one kilometer of subway. The cost-per-kilometer of subway in China varies from 500 million yuan (about US$72 million) to 1.2 billion yuan (about US$172 million), based on the difficulty of construction.

Landing site 
The landing site is within a crater called Von Kármán ( diameter) in the South Pole-Aitken Basin on the far side of the Moon that was still unexplored by landers. The site has symbolic as well as scientific value. Theodore von Kármán was the PhD advisor of Qian Xuesen, the founder of the Chinese space program.

The landing craft touched down at 02:26 UTC on 3 January 2019, becoming the first spacecraft to land on the far side of the Moon.

The Yutu-2 rover was deployed about 12 hours after the landing.

The selenographic coordinates of the landing site are 177.5991°E, 45.4446°S, at an elevation of -5935 m. The landing site was later (February 2019) named Statio Tianhe. Four other lunar features were also named during this mission: a mountain (Mons Tai) and three craters (Zhinyu, Hegu, and Tianjin).

Operations and results 
A few days after landing, Yutu-2 went into hibernation for its first lunar night and it resumed activities on 29 January 2019 with all instruments operating nominally. During its first full lunar day, the rover travelled , and on 11 February 2019 it powered down for its second lunar night. In May 2019, it was reported that Chang'e 4 has identified what appear to be mantle rocks on the surface, its primary objective. 

In January 2020, China released a large amount of data and high-resolution images from the mission lander and rover. In February 2020, Chinese astronomers reported, for the first time, a high-resolution image of a lunar ejecta sequence, and, as well, direct analysis of its internal architecture. These were based on observations made by the Lunar Penetrating Radar (LPR) on board the Yutu-2 rover while studying the far side of the Moon.

International collaboration 
Chang'e 4 marks the first major United States-China collaboration in space exploration since the 2011 Congressional ban. Scientists from both countries had regular contact prior to the landing. This included talks about observing plumes and particles lofted from the lunar surface by the probe's rocket exhaust during the landing to compare the results with theoretical predictions, but NASA's Lunar Reconnaissance Orbiter (LRO) was not in the right position for this during the landing. The Americans informed Chinese scientists about its satellites in orbit around the Moon, while the Chinese shared with American scientists the longitude, latitude, and timing of Chang'e 4's landing.

China has agreed to a request from NASA to use the Chang'e 4 probe and Queqiao relay satellite in future American Moon missions.

International reactions
NASA Administrator Jim Bridenstine congratulated China and hailed the success of the mission as "an impressive accomplishment".

Martin Wieser of the Swedish Institute of Space Physics and principal investigator on one of the instruments onboard Chang'e, said: "We know the far side from orbital images and satellites, but we don’t know it from the surface. It's uncharted territory and that makes it very exciting."

Gallery

See also
 Animals in space
 Plants in space
 Closed ecological system
 Exploration of the Moon
 List of missions to the Moon
 Luna 3, the first spacecraft to image the lunar far side
 List of artificial objects on the Moon

References

External links 

 CLEP
 Data Release and Information Service System of China's Lunar Exploration Program 
 China's Chang'e-4 mission lands on Moon's far side, snaps first image at Astronomy
 The scientific objectives and payloads of Chang'E4 mission

2018 in China
Chinese Lunar Exploration Program
Chinese space probes
Lunar rovers
Soft landings on the Moon
Space probes launched in 2018
Spacecraft launched by Long March rockets
Spacecraft using halo orbits
Space-flown life
Space farming
2019 on the Moon